Mai (also spelled May) is a feminine Arabic given name. It may refer to:

 Mai al-Kaila, incumbent Health Minister of Palestine
 Mai Ghoussoub, Lebanese writer
 May Hariri, Lebanese singer
 Mai Selim, Jordanian singer
 Mai Yamani, Saudi scholar
 May Ziadeh, Lebanese poet, essayist and translator

Arabic feminine given names